Myotis midastactus is a golden-coloured species of vesper bats from  South America, where it occurs in Bolivia and Paraguay. The characteristic golden fur of the bat distinguishes it from other South American bats.

References

Mouse-eared bats
Mammals described in 2014
Bats of South America